The  Copa Libertadores de Clubes de Futsal is an international futsal competition disputed between the best clubs of South America. Since 2002, the tournament is formally organized by CONMEBOL.

Competition format
Since 2002, the competition is divided in two zones, Zona Norte (North Zone) and Zona Sur (South Zone). This was intended to end the hegemony of the Brazilian teams in the tournament. Each zone is divided in two groups with a variable number of teams. The teams in each group play each other in a single party headquarters previously defined by CONMEBOL tournament for each zone. After playing all group matches the top two teams of each group meet in semifinals single party and crossed keys (first second of a group against the other), the winners of each match compete with each end of the area single party and the winner of the disputed area of the South American final against the winner of the other area the best of three games based determined by CONMEBOL. If a team does not attend matches as scheduled without justifying their absence and / or fails to reach agreement with the opposing team and the CONMEBOL to change dates, Champion declaring his opponent by Walkover (W.O.).

Results

Notes
* Champion is declared to Jaraguá because Bello Jairuby held off parties agreed to play in Brazil.''

** The tournament was not played in the North Zone. Consequently, the South Zone tournament proclaimed champion and runner-up on a continental level.

*** The tournament was originally scheduled to be played in La Guaira, Venezuela between 3–9 May 2016, but was later cancelled due to "for insurmountable force majeure and logistics". The tournament was relocated to be played in Asunción, Paraguay between 12 and 19 June 2016.

Statistics

Performance by club

Performance by nation

References

External links
 Official CONMEBOL website
 Torneo Sudamericano de Clubes de Futsal at RSSSF

 
International club futsal competitions
CONMEBOL club competitions
Futsal competitions in South America
Multi-national professional sports leagues